Adam Majewski (born 24 December 1973) is a Polish football manager and retired player who was most recently in charge of Polish club Stal Mielec.

Career
Majewski started his senior career with Wisła Płock. In 1999, he signed for Legia Warsaw in the Ekstraklasa, where he made 145 appearances and scored seven goals. After that, he played for Panionios G.S.S., Lech Poznań, and Zawisza Bydgoszcz. On 8 July 2021, he was appointed manager of Stal Mielec, replacing Włodzimierz Gąsior.

References

External links
 Adam Majewski - football player from our yard
 Adam Majewski: Players from the current Legia would not play with Okuki
 THIS ONE TIME Adam Majewski - a "solid league" with his debut in the national team
 Lechita from Płock
 The goal can be lost very easily, but it is worse to score it - an interview with Adam Majewski, Wisła Płock footballer

Living people
1973 births
Polish footballers
Polish football managers
Sportspeople from Płock
Association football midfielders
Wisła Płock players
Lech Poznań players
Dyskobolia Grodzisk Wielkopolski players
Legia Warsaw players
Panionios F.C. players
Zawisza Bydgoszcz players
Ekstraklasa players
I liga players
Super League Greece players
Poland international footballers
Ekstraklasa managers
I liga managers
OKS Stomil Olsztyn managers
Stal Mielec managers
Polish expatriate footballers
Expatriate footballers in Greece
Polish expatriate sportspeople in Greece